The Tyrolean hat, also Bavarian hat or Alpine hat, is a type of headwear that originally came from the Tyrol in the Alps, in what is now part of Austria, Germany, Italy and Switzerland. It is an essential and distinctive element of the local folk costume, or tracht.

Description 
A typical Tyrolean hat is made of green felt, which originally had a crown tapering to a point and a brim roughly the width of a hand, something that was especially common in the Zillertal, a Tyrollian valley in Austria. 

In addition to varying in shape and width of brim, the hats are characteristically decorated with a coloured, corded hatband and a spray of flowers, feathers or "brush" at the side of the crown. The traditional "brush", known as a gamsbart, is made of the beard of the chamois goat.  A large and showy one may contain thousands of individual hairs, and cost between $2,500 and $3,000.  It takes a variety of forms, and may often be combined with feathers.

History 
In the 19th and 20th centuries, Tyrolean costumes developed a certain degree of uniformity in their appearance. In the local village costumes of the Tyrol, the various styles of Tyrolean hat have survived since the 1830s/1840s, albeit similar to those of contemporary fashion. These original forms vary from the tall, relatively narrow-brimmed hats of North Tyrol which were dented on top, to the small, wide-brimmed hats of the South Tyrolean wine country.

Later the Tyrolean hat became the image bearer of "Tyrolean culture" as a tourist symbol, very popular at folk gatherings and beer festivals, such as the Munich Oktoberfest, and influenced by folk music bands who wore fanciful "local" costumes. The musician, Billy Mo, wrote a song in 1962 called "Ich kauf' mir lieber einen Tirolerhut" ("I Prefer to Buy a Tyrolean Hat"), which reinforced the link between the hat and traditional Alpine (brass band) folk music. In 1965, a comedy musical appeared under the same title.

The Tyrolean hat became even better known thanks to Edward VIII of Great Britain, who, after his abdication, frequently stayed in Austrian Styria and often wore a hat of Tyrolean style, although it did not come from there. It is said that the Tyrolean hat was the inspiration for the homburg, a style popularized beyond its native Germanic region by his grandfather, Edward VII.

Gallery

See also 
Campaign hat
 Seppel, the figure with a Seppelhut hat, the Bavarian-North Tyrolean felt cap with or without a brim

References

Austrian clothing
German clothing
Swiss clothing
Italian clothing
Hats